Cycling has been contested at every Summer Olympic Games since the birth of the modern Olympic movement at the 1896 Summer Olympics, at which a road race and five track events were held. Mountain bike racing entered the Olympic programme at the Atlanta Olympics, followed by BMX racing in 2008 and freestyle BMX in 2021. Prior to the 2020 Summer Olympics (which was postponed to 2021 due to the COVID-19 pandemic.), all events were speed races, but the 2020 programme featured BMX freestyle for the first time.

Women's road events were introduced to the Olympic programme at the 1984 Summer Olympics. Women's track events were added in 1988, and both types of events have been featured since then.

The 2012 Summer Olympics were the first at which men and women competed in the same number of events in all cycling disciplines, including track cycling, which previously had more men's and fewer women's events than the 2008 programme. However, women have shorter distances for some events.

Summary

Track cycling

Men's events

Women's events

Medal table
Source:
Last updated after the 2020 Summer Olympics

Road cycling

Men's events

Women's events

Medal table
Source:
Last updated after the 2020 Summer Olympics

Mountain biking

Events

Medal table
Source:
Last updated after the 2020 Summer Olympics

BMX racing

Events

Medal table
Source:
Last updated after the 2020 Summer Olympics

BMX freestyle

Events

Medal table
Source:
Last updated after the 2020 Summer Olympics

Overall medal table

Last updated after the 2020 Summer Olympics

Medalists

The top of the lists for most successful (by gold medals won) and most decorated (by all medals won) are dominated by recently active track cyclists from Great Britain, who rose to prominence from the Sydney 2000 Summer Olympics, and then dominance from the Beijing 2008 Games, winning 22 gold medals in the velodrome between 2008 and 2020, as well as single golds in road racing, road time trial, BMX freestyle, BMX racing and mountain biking in that timeframe. This sharp rise was largely thanks to significant funding by UK Sport of British Cycling. The most successful Olympic cyclists of each sex are husband-and-wife couple Jason and Laura Kenny, with Jason winning seven golds and two silver medals and Laura five golds and one silver medal. Jason also holds the record of most decorated cyclist, with nine medals, and is the only cyclist to have successfully defended Olympic gold medals in three different cycling events. Laura Kenny shares the title of most decorated female cyclist, with six medals, with Dutch legend Leontien van Moorsel (four golds, one silver and one bronze) and Australia sprint star Anna Meares (two gold, one silver and three bronze medals). Laura Kenny holds the unique distinction of winning the inaugural gold medals in three different events - women's team pursuit and women's omnium (both 2012) and women's madison (2020).

Great Britain's Chris Hoy, the first Olympic cyclist to win six gold medals, holds the unique distinction of having won gold across four different track disciplines; the Kilo, the team sprint (twice), match sprint and keirin (twice) disciplines. Three cyclists share the record for gold medals in the same event with three; Jason Kenny in team sprint, compatriot Ed Clancy in team pursuit, and American Kristin Armstrong in time trial. All three achieved the feat between 2008 and 2016.

Cyclists who have won 6 or more Olympic medals.
As of the 2020 Summer Olympics§ 
Riders in bold still active.

§ : currently ongoing.

Nations

See also
Cycling at the Summer Paralympics
Cycling at the Youth Olympic Games
List of Olympic venues in cycling

References

External links

 
Summer Olympics
Sports at the Summer Olympics